The Cerbat Mountains is a mountain range  in Mohave County in northwest Arizona immediately north of Kingman. The Cerbat Mountains and the White Hills (Arizona) adjacent north, are the dividing ranges between the Detrital Valley west, and the Hualapai Valley east.

It is a 23 mi long range trending slightly northwest–southeast. It lies directly east of the 130-mile long Black Mountains range and is separated by the Sacramento Valley bordering southwest of Kingman through which Interstate 40 turns south and west to meet Needles, California; the long Detrital Valley and plains drains northwest of the mountains into southern Lake Mead.

The Dolan Springs community is at the base of the wilderness on the northwestern side of the Cerbat Mountains.

The "Mineral Park mine", a large copper and turquoise mine, is located in the Cerbat Mountains 14 miles northwest of Kingman, Arizona.

See also
 List of mountain ranges of Arizona
 List of LCRV Wilderness Areas (Colorado River)

References

External links
 

Mountain ranges of Mohave County, Arizona
Mountain ranges of the Lower Colorado River Valley
Mountain ranges of the Mojave Desert
Mountain ranges of Arizona